"Ojitos Lindos" (English: "Beautiful Little Eyes") is a song by Puerto Rican rapper Bad Bunny and Colombian band Bomba Estéreo. The music video was released on February 14, 2023, through Rimas Entertainment as the ninth single of Bad Bunny's fifth studio album Un Verano Sin Ti (2022). The song was written by Benito Martínez, Liliana Saumet and Simón Mejía, the latter two who are the members of the Colombian band Bomba Estéreo. The song was produced by Tainy, La Paciencia and Mvsis. The song was also used in the EA Sports FIFA 23 soundtrack.

Lyrics
The lyrics of the song describes a girlfriend who longs to see her boyfriend again and thinks of his scent. She asks him to look into her eyes but the boyfriend replies by saying that he does not reply to her "Good Morning, I Love You".

Critical reception
Billboard ranked "Ojitos Lindos" the third best collaboration song from Un Verano Sin Ti, writing that the "collaboration between Bad Bunny and Bomba Estéreo perfectly merges both of their worlds" and that it "thrives on the fusion of trumpets and their fresh beats with a fascinating combination" of Liliana Saumet's high-pitched vocals as well as the "deep and slurred verses" from Bad Bunny.

Commercial performance
Following the release of its parent album, "Ojitos Lindos" charted at number 26 on the US Billboard Hot 100 dated May 21, 2022, making it the ninth-highest charting track from Un Verano Sin Ti, as well as charting on the US Hot Latin Songs at number 7. The song proved to be a significant commercial success as it peaked at number one in Bolivia, Chile, Colombia, Costa Rica, Ecuador, Mexico and Peru, as well as charting on the Billboard Global 200 at number 4. Additionally, it charted within the top 5 in Argentina and Spain.

Audio visualizer
A 360° audio visualizer for the song was uploaded to YouTube on May 6, 2022, along with the other audio visualizer videos of the songs that appeared on Un Verano Sin Ti.

Music video
The music video for "Ojitos Lindos" was released on YouTube on February 14, 2023.

Charts

Weekly charts

Year-end charts

Certifications

References

External links
 
 

2022 songs
Bad Bunny songs
Songs written by Bad Bunny